The 1896 Minnesota Golden Gophers football team represented the University of Minnesota in the 1896 Western Conference football season. The 1896 season was the first season under head coach Alexander Jerrems and was the first season of competition in the Big Ten Conference, or Western Conference as it was commonly referred to at the time.  Minnesota won its first ever conference game over Purdue but lost its other two matches to Michigan and Wisconsin.

Schedule

Roster
 Ends, Jack Harrison (captain and left end), Henry A. Scandrett (right end) 
 Tackles, Ivan A. Perry (left tackle), A.M. Smith (right tackle)
 Guards, George A.E. Finlayson (left guard), Everhard P. Harding (right guard)
 Center, James C. Fulton
 Quarterbacks, George E. Cole, Richard E. Woodworth
 Halfbacks, S.W. Bagley (right half), Martin Teigen, Elbridge L. Heath (left half)
 Fullback, Harry C. Loomis
 Substitutes, Clinton L. Walker, John Taresh, Carl S. Jorgens, Lloyd Sperry, Claude Nicoulin, L. Eugene Parker, Conrad H. Christopherson
 Trainer, Edward "Dad" Moulton 
 Coach, Alexander Jerrems

References

Minnesota
Minnesota Golden Gophers football seasons
Minnesota Golden Gophers football